The women's artistic individual all-around competition at the 2016 Summer Olympics in Rio de Janeiro was held at the Arena Olímpica do Rio on 11 August.

Simone Biles and Aly Raisman of the United States finished first and second in qualifications and then won the gold and silver medals in the event final. It was the fourth consecutive Olympic gold for the United States in this event. Defending Olympic individual all-around champion from 2012 Gabby Douglas also of the United States qualified third, and due to the strict "2 per country" policy in event finals, she did not advance. Biles had won the individual all-around at the last three World Artistic Gymnastics Championships in 2013, 2014, and 2015. Aliya Mustafina of Russia won her second consecutive Olympic individual all-around bronze.

Competition format
The top 24 qualifiers in the qualification phase (limit two per NOC), based on the combined score of each apparatus, advanced to the individual all-around final. The finalists performed on each apparatus again. Qualification scores were then ignored, with only final round scores counting.

Schedule
All times are local (UTC−3)

Qualification

Reserves
The reserves for the individual all-around event final were
 
 
 
 

Only two gymnasts from each country may advance to the all-around final. Therefore, in some cases, a third gymnast placed high enough to qualify, but did not advance to the final because of the quota. Gymnasts who did not advance to the final, but had high enough scores to do so were:
  (3rd place)
  (16th place)
  (22nd place)
  (23rd place)

Final

 Jade Barbosa was substituted in for Flávia Saraiva by the Brazilian federation, reportedly so that Saraiva could concentrate on preparing for the balance beam final. Barbosa withdrew after an injury on floor exercise.

References

Women's artistic qualification
2016
2016 in women's gymnastics
Women's events at the 2016 Summer Olympics